Nappy Roots is an American alternative Southern rap group. The group met in Bowling Green, Kentucky in 1995 while attending Western Kentucky University.  They are best known for their hit singles "Po' Folks", "Awnaw", "Roun' The Globe" and "Good Day".  They were the best selling hip hop group of 2002. The group consists of Milledgeville, Georgia native Fish Scales and Kentucky natives Skinny DeVille, B. Stille and Ron Clutch.

In 2006, R. Prophet left the group, and in 2012 Big V aka Vito Banga also left. Both are pursuing solo careers.

Biography
The group formed when the members were students at Western Kentucky University. Nappy Roots' debut independent album Country Fried Cess was released in 1998, which led to the group being signed by Atlantic Records. Their first album on Atlantic was 2002's best selling hip-hop album, Watermelon, Chicken & Gritz. The multi-platinum album featured the hit-singles "Headz Up", "Awnaw", and "Po' Folks". The "Awnaw (Remix)" featuring Marcos of P.O.D. appeared on Madden 2003.

In their home state, Paul E. Patton, the governor of Kentucky, sanctioned September 16 as "Nappy Roots Day".

Their next and last album with Atlantic Records was Wooden Leather, released in 2003, featuring the singles "Roun' the Globe", which was featured on Madden 2004, and "Sick and Tired" (featuring Anthony Hamilton). This critically acclaimed, major label follow-up album featured production from Kanye West, David Banner and Lil Jon.  Also in 2003, Nappy Roots were on the soundtrack to Daredevil, with the song "Right Now", which featured Marcos Curiel of P.O.D. and was released on Windup Records. In 2004, three songs by Nappy Roots were included in the movie soundtrack to The Ladykillers, released on Sony Music.

Since the release of Wooden Leather they have gone back to being independent artists, and have started their own label, N.R.E.G. (Nappy Roots Entertainment Group) with distribution through Fontana/Universal Music Group. On July 31, 2007, they released their first album as independent artists, Innerstate Music, featuring singles "Good Day" and "Keep It Real". This was actually an internet album, similar to a modern-day mixtape. It was intended to be a precursor to their 2008 album, The Humdinger, which was released on August 5, 2008.

In 2007 Nappy Roots was featured on the original version of the Tantric song titled "Fall Down". The song had originally been intended for Tantric's album Tantric III, but due to the album being shelved, the song went unreleased. However, Tantric did re-record the song for their 2008 album The End Begins. The version featuring Nappy Roots can only be found on YouTube.

The critically acclaimed album The Humdinger features guest appearances from Anthony Hamilton, Greg Nice, Greg Street and Slick & Rose, with production from Sol Messiah, James "Groove" Chambers, BIG AL 360, Joe Hop and more. The album entered the Billboard Rap Charts at No. 7 and R&B/Hip-Hop Albums at No. 13.

In 2009 the single "We're Gonna Make it" by Skinny and Scales was released through Nappy Roots Entertainment Group.

Nappy Roots kicked off 2010 with their highly anticipated new album, The Pursuit of Nappyness, released on June 15, 2010. The album features songs by Phivestarr Productions, a production duo from Atlanta, Georgia.

In 2011, Nappy Roots teamed up with hip hop producers Organized Noize to create Nappy Dot Org. The first single, "Congratulations", was made available online on July 13, 2011 by way of XXL Magazine and 2DopeBoyz. On October 11, 2011 Nappy Roots released Nappy Dot Org, entirely produced by Organized Noize.

The Nappy Roots Presents Sh!ts Beautiful album/mixtape was released on June 27, 2012 through AllHipHop.

In 2015, Nappy Roots released their most recent album, The 40 Akerz Project.

In 2018, the Cincinnati Bengals featured Nappy Roots song "Good Day" in their promotional video "Seize the DEY".

Singles

Discography

Studio albums

Featured tracks

Mixtapes

Music videos

Awards and nominations

2002
 2002 MTV Video Music Award nomination for the MTV2 Award for "Awnaw" - shared nomination with Jazze Pha

2003
 2003 American Music Award nominations for Favorite Band, Duo or Group - Hip-Hop/R&B and Favorite New Artist - Hip-Hop/R&B
 2003 Grammy Award nominations for Best Rap/Sung Collaboration for "Po' Folks" - shared nomination with Anthony Hamilton and Best Long Form Music Video for "The World According to Nappy" - shared nomination with Gloria Gabriel, director; David Anthony 
 2003 Soul Train Award nomination for Best R&B/Soul or Rap New Artist for "Awnaw"

2008
 2008 HipHopDX Award for "The Humdinger"

2011
 2011 SEA Award for "The Pursuit Of Nappyness" - Album of the Year nomination

See also
Afro-textured hair

References

External links
 Official site
 Official Nappy Dot Org site
 Nappy Roots at Myspace
Nappy Roots on BandsInTown
Atlantucky Brewing

Southern hip hop groups
Musical groups from Kentucky
Musicians from Bowling Green, Kentucky
Atlantic Records artists
Musical groups established in 1995
Alternative hip hop groups
1995 establishments in Kentucky